The Ghastly Ones can refer to:
 Blood Rites (film) (AKA The Ghastly Ones), a 1968 horror film directed by Andy Milligan
 Ghastly Ones, a California surf band formed in 1996